Antarcticibacterium flavum is a Gram-negative, strictly aerobic and rod-shaped bacterium from the genus of Antarcticibacterium which has been isolated from sediments from the Ross Sea. The whole genome of Antarcticibacterium flavum is sequenced.

References 

Flavobacteria
Bacteria described in 2018